Shama Sikander Ali Gesawat (born 4 August 1981) is an Indian actress, best recognised for her lead roles in TV series Yeh Meri Life Hai and short film Sexaholic and the mini-series Maaya: Slave of Her Desires. Sikander has appeared in numerous Bollywood films, including starting her career with the 1999 Aamir Khan starring Mann. Her last theatricals release, a Bollywood thriller, Bypass Road was released on 8 November 2019.

Early life
Shama Sikander was born in Makrana, Rajasthan, India. She was born to mother Gulshan and father Sikander Ali Gesawat. At the age of 9 her family moved to Mumbai, Maharashtra, where she lived together with her younger siblings, Khalid, Rizwan Sikander, and Salma (born 1991). Sikander has mentioned in interviews that her early years in Mumbai were extremely difficult, even commenting that at times "there was no food in the house to feed the family".

Having moved locations frequently, Sikander attended as many as nine schools in her early life in Makrana and in various parts of Greater Mumbai including Malad, Mumbra, Thane, and Andheri. Following her completion of the 10th grade, and passing the Indian Certificate of Secondary Education examination, Sikander enrolled in the Roshan Taneja School of Acting in Mumbai in 1995, graduating from the course a year later.

Career

Sikander began her career on the big screen with small parts in Prem Aggan (1998, Hindi) and Mann (1999, Hindi) before landing a supporting role in Ansh: The Deadly Part (2002, Hindi). Her first major role on television was as the title character "Pooja Mehta" in the popular Sony TV drama Ye Meri Life Hai (2003-2005). The performance earned her numerous nominations and awards, her wins including the 12th Annual Lion's Gold Awards' Critics' Choice "Best Actress" (2005), Indian Television Academy Awards' "GR8! Face of the Year" (2004), and "Best Debut" (2004). Sikander subsequently anchored Popkorn Newz (2007) and Jet Set Go (2008) before returning to film with lead role of "Jiya" in Dhoom Dhadaka (2008). She subsequently appeared in the lead role of "Shunyaa" on the supernatural thriller TV series Seven (2010-2011 Hindi) produced by Bollywood juggernaut Yash Raj Films. She was seen as "Byankar Pari", the lead antagonist in the children's program Baal Veer (2012–2014) on SAB TV.

While working to establish herself in Mumbai's Bollywood industry, Sikander traveled hours, daily from the outskirts of the city to attend auditions, often accompanied by her brother, Rizwan Sikander, also an actor.

Her film debut came at the age of 16, in 1998 with the Hindi-language feature film Prem Aggan, produced and directed by acclaimed film personality Feroz Khan. After a friend suggested she screen test for the part, Sikander so impressed Feroz Khan that she landed the role, even though it had already been cast. Despite significant hype, the film, which also featured Feroz Khan's son Fardeen Khan's debut, was both a critical and box office failure. Nevertheless, one critic praised her screen presence and commented "[Sikander is] friendly to the viewers' eyes."

A year later Sikander appeared in the Amir Khan starer Mann (1999 Hindi) in a cameo as Kamini. Directed by Indra Kumar the film received mixed reviews and did not do well at the box office. As with her debut in Prem Aggan, however, Sikander received positive reviews for her performance. Calling her "pretty and emotive", Mohammad Ali Ikram of Planet Bollywood exclaimed "Mark my words, this simple stunner has the ability to shine as a great performer and star".

Ansh: The Deadly Part (2002) was Sikander's first supporting role in a Hindi-language feature film. Portraying the character Kusum opposite south Indian actor Abbas, the film produced by Rukamanee Arts was a box office success doing reasonably well and garnering generally favorable reviews. Despite Ansh being her best-faring feature film so far, Sikander would not have another big screen release for the next six years.

Actor (2003–present)

Though her feature films failed to establish Sikander as a box office success, her Television debut portraying the title character "Pooja Metha" in the popular Sony TV drama Ye Meri Life Hai (2003-2005) made the show a household name overnight, gave her "instant fame", and eventually elevated her to "one of the most loved faces on Indian television.". Her performance earned her numerous nominations, her wins including The Indian Television Academy Awards' "GR8 Face of the Year" (2004), The Indian Television Academy Awards' "Best Debut" (2004), The 12th Annual Lion's Gold Awards' "Best Actress: Critics' Choice" (2005), and Sony TV's "Best Face" (2005). The same year she was seen in the lead role in Chand Bujh Gaya, a film on the Godhra train burning and 2002 Gujarat riots, which was initially refused certification by CBFC and FCAT and could be released only after the producers approached the Bombay High Court.

Fueled by the success of Ye Meri Life Hai and her subsequent performances, Sikander would be seen in frequent guest appearances on various popular programs including Batliwala House No. 43 (2005), CID (2006), Jodee Kamaal Ki (2007), Kaajjal (2008), and Man Mein Hai Visshwas (2009).

Beginning in 2007 Sikander also featured as a TV program Host – first of entertainment channel Zoom's Popkorn Newz for a single season, and then in 2008, as the host of the STAR One travel-contest program Jet Set Go. An accomplished self-taught dancer and amateur singer, 2008 would also see Sikander appear on numerous programs including celebrity dance program Ek Khiladi Ek Haseena as a celebrity contestant alongside notable Indian cricketer Vinod Kambli (where she drew praise from Bollywood Superstar Sushmita Sen who called her "one of the most fabulous dancers I've ever seen"), next in the singing reality program Jjhoom India again as a celebrity contestant, as well as India's longest running dance program Boogie Woogie as a celebrity guest performer in 2010 and subsequently on multiple occasions as a performer as a guest judge. Her ability to showcase well in singing, dance, hosting as well as acting caused critics to comment on her versatility as a performer, identifying her as one of the few who have been able to navigate between film and television. While her TV career flourished, Sikander returned to film in 2008 with a supporting role in director Shashi Ranjan's Dhoom Dhadaka alongside notable Bollywood actors Jackie Shroff, Anupam Kher, Gulshan Grover, and Satish Kaushik. The film was a box office failure and regarded by critics as average to disappointing. Sify's Sonia Chopra commented that "The cast doesn't disappoint as much as the film", and that "Shama Sikander [is] earnest enough ... molten-hot and ... superbly styled".

2010 saw Sikander return to a lead role in a television series for the first time since leaving Ye Meri Life Hai in 2005. Sikander's Shunyaa featured as the central character in the supernatural thriller series Seven (2010-2011 Hindi) produced by the Bollywood juggernaut Yash Raj Films. With a production budget far in excess of any television program that came before,  YRF's Seven aired weekly episodes instead of daily, in contrast to its competing programing. Sikander's performance and the program as a whole was widely appreciated for being "daringly different", with its own "dedicated audience" eliciting a "huge response through ... platforms like internet, e-mails and social networking sites." Nevertheless, perhaps due to its weekly format, lack of significant promotion, excessive production budget, and YRF's primary focus on its film division, Seven experienced only niche viewership and was eventually brought to a close after only one season of 26 episodes.

After a short break Sikander took the role of the main antagonist, Byankar Pari, in the young-adult fantasy program Baal Veer starting in September 2012. Baal Veer stands as one of the channel's, and indeed the market segment's, highest rated programs. Sikander quit the show in 2014.

In March 2016, Sikander featured in the short film Sexaholic. Bollywoodlife.com noted that Sikander's performance in the YouTube series "treading into a territory, which would make many male actors balk, Shama is supremely comfortable with her choice."

Continuing to captivate audiences with bold content distributed exclusively online on YouTube, in early 2017 Sikander was featured in the title role of Maaya in Maaya: Slave of Her Desires directed by Vikram Bhatt. Dealing with "the theme of BDSM - a variety of erotic practices or role playing involving bondage, discipline, dominance and submission," the miniseries is frequently cited as among the best produced in India till date.

In December 2017, Sikander announced Ab Dil Ki Sunn, the maiden project of her home production in which she also plays the lead role. Inspired by her own life incidents, Ab Dil Ki Sunn features 7 short films based on different human aspects such as bipolar disorder, depression, and other social and emotional complexities, once again distributed exclusively on YouTube. Ab Dil Ki Sunn launched on YouTube in early 2018 and the event was attended by many notable Bollywood celebrities.

Sikander's return to the theaters comes by way of the November 1st 2019 release of the mainstream Bollywood thriller Bypass Road. Starring Sikander alongside notable actors including Neil Nitin Mukesh, Adah Sharma, Sudhanshu Pandey, Manish Chaudhary, Rajit Kapoor, and Gul Panag the Times of India predicts "it is sure going to be one edge-of-the-seat thriller."

Designer (2010–present)
On 3 December 2010 Sikander launched her women's wear fashion label Saisha in the upscale Mumbai suburb of Bandra West, with the high profile and widely covered inauguration attended by her close friends and Bollywood superstars Sushmita Sen and Jackie Shroff. Sikander has showcased her collection numerous times since, often, but not always, appearing on the ramp in her own designs. Saisha has appeared both domestically in Hyderabad Fashion Week and Mumbai's Lakme Fashion Week, as well as internationally, most notably in South Africa.

Film, music and music video producer (2012–present)

Opting in late 2017 to divide her attention between performance and production, Sikander incorporated the Film and TV production company Shama Sikander Films Pvt. Ltd. which is best known for the short film series Ab Dil Ki Sunn.

Having previously featured in a number of music videos in Punjabi and other Indian languages (most notably for acclaimed singer Abhijeet) Sikander reportedly produced a (very sensuous) music video featuring herself alongside boyfriend actor / musician Alexx O'Nell picturising his original English language composition entitled 'Still on My Mind'. The video, which marks their first on screen collaboration has not yet been released. Reports also indicated that she may have been producing an entire English language album authored by O'Nell. In March, Shama Sikander appeared in a music video, Hawa Karda by Koinage Records opposite T.V. actor Gaurav Bajaj. The song was sung by Punjabi Singer Afsana Khan and Sahil Sharma.

In the media
Sikander's sex appeal has been picked up on by many sources, focusing on her fitness regimen, diet, and style sense.

She has been featured in numerous magazine spreads as well as appearing on the cover of GR8! Magazine more than any other actress, three times for the English Edition: March 2010, July 2006, February 2005, as well as at least twice for the Hindi Edition. She also appeared on the cover of Showtime Magazine in December 2011. Sikander was deemed October 2011's 'Hottie of the Month' by Perfect Woman Magazine, and featured in the 'Perfect Woman Spotlight' in May 2013 and Zing Magazine's 'Travel Diaries' in March 2013.

Additionally, Sikander has appeared in print and on the ramp supporting various notable fashion labels and designers including Manish Malhotra & Shaina NC, Neeta Lulla, Nisha Jamvwal, the world-renowned Ritu Kumar, as well as her own brand Saisha. In addition to heading the creative development of Saisha's women's wear designs, Sikander who has been referred to as a "fashion connoisseur" even reportedly contributed design expertise for the creation of wardrobe for her various projects including the fantastical Baal Veer.

Listing among her activities kickboxing, power yoga and dance, Sikander has commented "fitness has always been an integral part of my daily routine ... I ensure that I work out  for at least an hour ... [I] eat right and think positive."

Sikander's hobbies, including the violin, photography and most recently abstract painting, often feature in media coverage.

The actress is also said to be multi-lingual, speaking six languages including Hindi, English, Urdu, Gujarati, Marathi and Marwadi (of her native Rajasthan).

Personal life

Relationships

In 2010 Indian gossip columnist Vicky Lalwani linked Sikander to actor Mimoh Chakraborty – a claim both parties denied.

In mid-2011 speculation began regarding Sikander's relationship with India-based American actor / musician Alexx O'Nell. The two were spotted with increasing frequency throughout 2011. Sikander confirmed that they were once in a relationship in an interview with Hindustan Times. Sikander and O'Nell's relationship was confirmed to be over in January 2015.

In January 2016, it was confirmed that Sikander got engaged to American businessman James Milliron in Dubai, UAE. On 14 March 2022, the couple tied knot in Goa Christian ceremony.

Filmography

Movies

Television

Television: Dance & Reality

Web series

Music videos

Awards and nominations

References

External links

 
 
 

1981 births
21st-century Indian actresses
Actresses in Hindi cinema
Indian film actresses
Living people
Actresses from Mumbai
Rajasthani people
Actresses in Hindi television